James Bray may refer to:

James Bray (cricketer, born 1790) (1790–1869), Kent and Sussex cricketer
James Bray (cricketer, born 1853) (1853–1898), Kent cricketer
James Bray (baseball) (1898–1931), American Negro league baseball player
James Bray, American World War II combat cameraman trained at the First Motion Picture Unit
James H. Bray (born 1954), past president of the American Psychological Association
Jim Bray (born 1961), American actor and roller skater